A charabanc or "char-à-banc"  (often pronounced "sharra-bang" in colloquial British English) is a type of horse-drawn vehicle or early motor coach, usually open-topped, common in Britain during the early part of the 20th century. It has "benched seats arranged in rows, looking forward, commonly used for large parties, whether as public conveyances or for excursions". It was especially popular for sight-seeing or "works outings" to the country or the seaside, organised by businesses once a year. The name derives from the French  ("carriage with wooden benches"), the vehicle having originated in France in the early 19th century.

Although the vehicle has not been common on the roads since the 1920s, a few signs survive from the era; a notable example at Wookey Hole in Somerset warns that the road to the neighbouring village of Easton is unsuitable for charabancs. The word is in common usage especially in Northern England in a jocular way referring to works outings by coach.

In Australia a modern similar type of bus or motorcoach, with two lateral doors for each row of seats, survived up to the 1970s and was referred to as side loader bus; but all or most of them were not open-topped. One such a bus based in Echuca, Victoria, has been restored and is used at the Port of Echuca on some public holidays and special events.

Buses with similar arrangement of doors and seats are a common equipment for the antiriot squads of many police forces, as the arrangement lends itself to the squad exiting the vehicle quickly.

History

It could be pulled by a four-in-hand team of horses or a pair in pole gear. It had two or more rows of crosswise bench seats, plus a slightly lower rear seat for a groom, and most also had a slatted trunk for luggage. Initially used by the wealthy, they were later enlarged with more seats for school or works excursions and tourist transport, as a cheaper version of the tourist coach. The first charabanc in Britain was presented to Queen Victoria by Louis Philippe of France and is preserved in the Royal Mews.

Before the First World War, motor charabancs were used mainly for day trips, as they were not comfortable enough for longer journeys, and were largely replaced by motor buses in the 1920s.

The charabanc of the 1920s tended to last only a few years. It was normal at the time for the body to be built separately from the motor chassis, and some were fitted in summer only; a second goods body would be fitted in its place in winter to keep the vehicle occupied.

Charabancs were normally open-top, with a large canvas folding hood stowed at the rear in case of rain, much like a convertible motor car. If rain started, this had to be pulled into position, a very heavy task, and it was considered honourable for the male members of the touring party to assist in getting it into position. The side windows would be of mica (a thin layer of quartz-like stone).

The charabanc offered little or no protection to the passengers in the event of an overturning accident, they had a high centre of gravity when loaded (and particularly if overloaded), and they often traversed the steep and winding roads leading to the coastal villages popular with tourists. These factors led to fatal accidents, which contributed to their early demise.

In Northern England
Factory day outings (annual works trips) in the 19th and early 20th century were quite common for workers, especially for those from the northern weaving mill towns of Lancashire and Yorkshire during the wakes weeks. The 1940s and 1950s were relatively hard times due to national recovery being slow after the Second World War; rationing was still evident, and annual holidays had not really become established for poorer workers such as weavers and spinners, so a day's outing to the seaside was a rare treat and all that some workers with large families could afford. "Charabanc trips" were usually only for adults, again due to finance. Occasionally the mill owner would help to pay for these outings, but this was not always the case.

The charabancs, or coaches, were pretty basic vehicles; noisy, uncomfortable and often poorly upholstered with low-backed seats and used mainly for short journeys to the nearest resort town or the races. Some working men's clubs also organised days out, and these trips were often subsidised by the clubs themselves from membership subscriptions that had been paid throughout the year. A few pence a week would be paid to a club or mill trip organiser and marked down in a notebook. This would be paid out to the saver on the day of the trip as spending money on the day. This day out would often be the highlight of the year for some workers and the only chance to get away from the smog and grime of the busy mill towns.

Later, in the late 1960s and 1970s, as the mills prospered and things improved financially, the annual "wakes week" took over and a one-week mass exodus from northern mill towns during the summer months took precedence over the charabanc trips, and a full week's holiday at a holiday camp or in a seaside boarding house for the full family became the norm, instead of a single day out.

Cultural references

The French  appears in Leo Tolstoy's Anna Karenina (1877) in part 6, chapter 17 in the Pevear/Volokhonsky translation (2000).

The charabanc is notably mentioned in Dylan Thomas's short story "A Story", also known as "The Outing". In this piece the young Thomas unintentionally finds himself on the annual men's charabanc outing to Porthcawl. Within the story the charabanc is referred to as a "chara" in colloquial Welsh English.

Cider with Rosie by Laurie Lee features a 1917 charabanc outing from rural Gloucestershire to Weston-super-Mare.

The first verse of “Maginot Waltz” by Ralph McTell starts: “All off to Brighton in a char-a-banc”.

Vince Hill's A Day at the Seaside begins with the line "Climb up little darling, into the charabanc". The song, written by Les Vandyke, came fifth in the 1963 Song for Europe competition.

A char-a-banc also figures prominently in Rudyard Kipling's short story "The Village that Voted the Earth Was Flat" (1913).

Char-a-bancs are mentioned in Dorothy Edwards' book The Witches and the Grinnygog in the chapter entitled "Mrs. Umphrey's Ghost Story".  In it, Mrs. Umphrey tries to reassure the ghost of Margaret that the char-a-bancs are not the chariots of devils.

"Peaches", a single by the Stranglers makes reference to a charabanc, with vocalist Hugh Cornwell explaining to the listener how he will be stuck on a beach "the whole summer" after missing a charabanc.

In Agatha Christie's "The Dead Harlequin", from The Mysterious Mr Quin series, the young artist Frank Bristow reacts angrily to the older Colonel Monkton's dismissive (and presumably snobbish) attitude towards charabancs and their use in tourism. They are also mentioned in the story "Double Sin" when the motor coach Poirot and Hastings are traveling on stops for lunch at  Monkhampton: "...in a big courtyard, about twenty char-a-bancs were parked—char-a-bancs which had come from all over the country".

Charabancs appeared several times in John Le Carre's The Little Drummer Girl.

The Jethro Tull song "Wond'ring Again" by Ian Anderson uses the term: "Incestuous ancestry's charabanc ride..."

George Harrison described the plot of The Beatles' 1967 film Magical Mystery Tour "a charabanc trip".

On the Small Faces' 1968 album Ogden's Nut Gone Flake, the title character of the Happiness Stan suite of songs taking up side 2 lives in a Charabanc, described in characteristic fashion by narrator Stanley Unwin as "a four-wheeled fillolop out the backgrove". On the 1968 performance by the band of the suite on BBC2's Colour Me Pop, Unwin renders this section as "an ancient Victoriana Charabanc – and this was the old type, sit-up-and-beg, rotate fit a poppy with solid wheels."

The charabanc appears in Louisa May Alcott's Little Women. Mr Lawrence, the March's wealthy neighbour, lends it to the March girls. Jokingly, they call it the "cherry bounce".

In Malta, a British colony until 1964, the term (spelled Xarabank) survives today, and is used to designate a public transport bus.

A trip to the seaside is the subject of the humorous song The Charabanc by Ivor Biggun.

See also

 Charabanc (rail), used at one time for second- and third-class travel.
 Stage Limousine
 Songthaew

References

External links
 Charabancs, coaches and carriages on Jersey
Rockin' Down the Highway with Paul Grushkin: April 2007.
Seabrook Coaching Stable Dispersal Auction: Roof-seat Break. The Carriage Association of America, Inc.
Side loader bus in Tasmanian Transport Museum

Bus transport in the United Kingdom
Animal-powered vehicles
Buses by type